Lotte Cultureworks (also known as Lotte Entertainment) is a South Korean film production and distribution company. Established in the Republic of Korea, the company has distributed films throughout South Korea since their founding in September 2003. It is a subsidiary of Lotte Corporation and the sub-distributor of American film studio Paramount Pictures in Korea. In 2018, Lotte Cultureworks overtook CJ Entertainment to become the country's leading distributor, following the box-office success of fantasy franchise Along With the Gods.

Releases

Films

Television series

References

External links 
 

Film distributors of South Korea
Film production companies of South Korea
Television production companies of South Korea
Entertainment
Companies based in Seoul
Mass media companies established in 2003
South Korean brands
International sales agents